Richard Delmer Boyer (born 1958) is an American murderer convicted and found guilty of murdering an elderly couple in 1982. He also admitted to murdering another man in 1980.

Background
Boyer, from La Mirada, California, was at his home abusing PCP as well as abusing alcohol while watching the 1981 movie Halloween II. The opening murders in the film were used by him to be blamed (logically dismissed in reality, in court) as a motive.

Crime and arrest
On December 7, 1982, Boyer stabbed to death an elderly couple in Fullerton, California; he stabbed the husband 24 times and the wife 19 times. He was arrested following a tip-off from the victim's son. He was about to be released by the police when he admitted the crime.

Trial
During the trial, Boyer was revealed to be a drug addict. He had consumed both alcohol and drugs on the day of the murder. He stated that he had driven to the victim's house to borrow money. At the property, he stated he started "freaking out" and could not remember committing the crime. The first trial ended in a hung jury. In the second trial, in 1984, a defense psychopharmacologist testified that Boyer had suffered a drug-induced flashback to a horror film, Halloween II, which features a scene with an elderly couple. The film was shown to the jury, the first time in US legal history that a commercial motion picture had been submitted as evidence at a murder trial. The jury found him guilty, and the judge sentenced Boyer to death.

The California Supreme Court ordered a retrial in 1989, stating that Boyer had been denied his Miranda rights.

In 1991, he was linked to another murder, that of 75-year-old John Houston Compton in 1980, but the District Attorney stated they would not pursue it if it distracted from the forthcoming retrial.

In 1992, Boyer was retried, and he was again found guilty and sentenced to death.

See also
 List of death row inmates in the United States

References

Bibliography

1958 births
1982 murders in the United States
American people convicted of murder
Living people
People convicted of murder by California
Place of birth missing (living people)
Prisoners sentenced to death by California
Suspected serial killers